This is a list of the heads of mission from Hungary to the Court of St James's in London.

Ambassadors from Austria-Hungary

Ambassadors from the Kingdom of Hungary

Charge d'affaires
 1921-1922: István Hedry

Envoy extraordinary
 1922-1924: Count László Szapáry
 1924-1932: Baron Iván Rubido-Zichy
 1933-1935: Count László Széchenyi
 1936-1938: Szilárd Masirevich
 1938-1941: György Barcza
After the Invasion of Yugoslavia, the diplomatic relations were interrupted by the United Kingdom on 7 April 1941, which were only recovered after the Paris Peace.

Ambassadors from the People's Republic of Hungary

Envoy extraordinary
 1947-1948: István Bede
 1948-1949: János Erőss
 1949-1951: Elek Bolgár
 1951-1953: Imre Horváth
 1953-1957: János Katona
 1957-1959: Pál Földes
 1959-1963: Béla Szilágyi

Ambassador extraordinary and plenipotentiary
 1963-1969: Jenő Incze

Charge d'affaires
 1969-1970: György Varsányi

Ambassador extraordinary and plenipotentiary
 1970-1976: Vencel Házi
 1976-1981: János N. Lőrincz
 1981-1984: Rezső Bányász
 1984-1989: Mátyás Domokos
 1989-1990: Dr. József Györke

Ambassadors from Hungary

Ambassador extraordinary and plenipotentiary
 1990-1995: Tibor Antalpéter
 1995-1997: Tádé Alföldy
 1997-2002: Gábor Szentiványi
 2002-2006: Béla Szombati
 2007-2010: Borbála Czakó
 2011-2014: János Csák
 2014-2016: Péter Szabadhegy
 2016-2020: Kristóf Szalay-Bobrovniczky
 2020-    : Ferenc Kumin

See also
 List of diplomatic missions of Hungary
 List of ambassadors of the United Kingdom to Hungary

References
 Magyar képviselet az Egyesült Királyságban 

Hungary
 
United Kingdom